1,2-Dibromobenzene is an organobromine compound with the formula C6H4Br2.  It is one of three isomers, the others being 1,3- and 1,4-dibromobenzene.  It is a colorless liquid, although impure samples appear yellowish.  The compound is a precursor to many 1,2-disubstituted derivatives of benzene. For example, it is a precursor to 1,2-dicyanobenzene and dithioethers.

See also
 1,3-Dibromobenzene
 1,4-Dibromobenzene

References

Bromoarenes